Jack Dyer Warner (born July 12, 1940, at Brandywine, West Virginia) is an American former Major League Baseball relief pitcher.

Signed by the Chicago Cubs as an amateur free agent in 1958, Warner appeared in parts of four seasons for the Cubs from 1962 to 1965.  He pitched in a total of 33 games for Chicago, with a career record of 0–2, 54.2 innings pitched, 23 strikeouts, 13 games finished, and an ERA of 5.10.

Perhaps his best game was one in which he was the losing pitcher. This took place in the second game of a doubleheader at Forbes Field on July 21, 1963. Warner pitched scoreless ball in the bottom of the 11th, 12th, and 13th innings against the Pittsburgh Pirates, but gave up a run with two out in the bottom of the 14th for a 6–5 loss. Warner also achieved his only major league hit in this game, a single in the top of the 14th against eventual winning pitcher Don Cardwell.

Trivia
Warner held All-Stars Leo Cárdenas, Tim McCarver, Denis Menke, and Bob Skinner to a .077 collective batting average. (1-for-13)

References

External links
Retrosheet

1940 births
Living people
Chicago Cubs players
Major League Baseball pitchers
Baseball players from West Virginia
People from Pendleton County, West Virginia